Il giustiziere di mezzogiorno (Italian for The Noonday Executioner) is a 1975 Italian comedy film written and directed by Mario Amendola. It is a parody of Death Wish.

Plot

Abandoned by his wife and daughter, after suffering some injustices, the surveyor Franco Gabbiani decides to take revenge against dishonest policemen, politicians and bullies.

Cast 

Franco Franchi as Franco Gabbiani
 Ombretta De Carlo as  Agata
Aldo Puglisi as  Fernando
Gigi Ballista as  Director Filiberto Rossetti
 Raf Luca as  Balloria
Maria Antonietta Beluzzi as  Mrs. Barzuacchi  
Franco Diogene as  Nardini 
Vincenzo Crocitti as Trippa
Mario Pisu as Inspector
Tom Felleghy as  Rakosky 
Alberto Farnese as  Mr. Lorenzi 
Enzo Andronico as  Padre di famiglia

See also
 List of Italian films of 1975

References

External links

Il giustiziere di mezzogiorno at Variety Distribution

1975 films
Italian sex comedy films
1970s crime comedy films
Films directed by Mario Amendola
1970s parody films
Italian crime comedy films
Italian films about revenge
1970s sex comedy films
Italian parody films
1975 comedy films
1970s Italian films
1970s Italian-language films